The Poole by-election of 1884 was fought on 19 April 1884. The by-election was fought due to the death of the incumbent MP, Charles Schreiber. It was won by the Conservative candidate William James Harris.

Background 
Charles Schreiber had been elected at the 1880 general election, representing Poole, Dorset until his death in March 1884. A by-election was called for the following month.

Results

References 

History of Poole
By-elections to the Parliament of the United Kingdom in Dorset constituencies
1884 in England
19th century in Dorset
1884 elections in the United Kingdom
Politics of Poole